Hélder Marino Rodrigues Cristóvão (born 21 March 1971), known simply as Hélder as a player, is a Portuguese former professional footballer who played as a central defender, currently manager of F.C. Penafiel.

He amassed Primeira Liga totals of 197 matches and 16 goals over eight seasons, mostly with Benfica. He also competed professionally in Spain, England, France and Greece, representing mainly Deportivo.

Hélder appeared for Portugal at Euro 1996. In 2009, he started working as a manager, going on to spend several years with Benfica's reserves.

Playing career

Club
Born in Luanda, Portuguese Angola, Hélder first attracted attention as a G.D. Estoril Praia player, moving to S.L. Benfica for the 1992–93 season where he would stay the following four and a half years, mainly as a starter. In December 1996 he signed for Deportivo de La Coruña, playing 22 La Liga matches in only six months as the club finished in third position.

In November 1999, Hélder joined Newcastle United of the Premier League on loan for a fee of £500,000, making 12 official appearances and scoring in a 2–2 away draw against Sunderland in the Tyne–Wear derby the following 6 February. In that season, the Spaniards went on to conquer their first league title, with the player failing to contribute in that competition; he returned to Depor subsequently, appearing very rarely in his last year, which ended in conquest of the Copa del Rey.

For the 2002–03 campaign, aged 31, Hélder returned to Benfica, playing there two more years (winning the Taça de Portugal in 2004) and joining Paris Saint-Germain F.C. the following season, where he teamed up with compatriot Pauleta. He spent his last year at Athlitiki Enosi Larissa F.C. in 2005–06, appearing rarely in the Super League Greece and retiring subsequently.

International
Hélder earned 35 caps for the Portugal national team, scoring three goals. His first was on 12 February 1992 in a 2–0 win over the Netherlands in an exhibition game, and his last a 4–0 loss to France in Paris on 25 April 2001, in another friendly.

Hélder represented the nation at UEFA Euro 1996, appearing in all four matches for the quarter-finalists as he started alongside Fernando Couto.

Coaching career
Cristóvão began working as a manager in the summer of 2009, precisely with his first club Estoril (in the Segunda Liga). On 28 September, merely two months after being appointed, he was fired.

On 3 July 2013, Cristóvão returned to Benfica as manager of the reserve team, replacing Luís Norton de Matos. In the 2014–15 season, he led them to their second best position in the second tier, a sixth place (fifth in 2013–14), as the highest scoring team with 81 goals.

Benfica B only managed to stave off relegation in the 2015–16 campaign in the last matchday, defeating S.C. Freamunde 5–0 at home and also benefitting from a 1–1 draw between C.D. Mafra and C.D. Aves. Cristóvão's team collected more losses (21) than wins (15), conceding 64 times whilst scoring 59; additionally, on 15 March 2016, he was suspended for 30 days after being sent off against S.C. Covilhã, which ended with a 2–2 home draw.

On 5 April 2018, Cristóvão announced he would leave Benfica at the end of the season. In August that year, he was hired as director of football and academy director at Al Nassr FC in the Saudi Professional League. He became caretaker manager in November after the exit of José Daniel Carreño, and relinquished that role when compatriot Rui Vitória was appointed the following January. Three months later, he was given a new job in the same league at Ettifaq FC who had two games remaining to avoid relegation, which was finally achieved.

Cristóvão was named manager of FC DAC 1904 Dunajská Streda on 6 January 2020, taking charge of the third-placed team of the Slovak Super Liga on a deal until 31 May. On 15 May, however, the club decided not to renew his contract.

On 7 June 2021, Cristóvão was appointed at newly promoted Al-Hazem F.C. in the Saudi top division. He was removed from the bottom-placed side on 27 November and replaced by Constantin Gâlcă.

Cristóvão was hired by Ismaily SC, placed last in the Egyptian Premier League, on 13 September 2022. His contract was terminated hours later, allegedly due to misinformation presented on his curriculum vitae by his agent.

Personal life
Cristóvão's son, Flávio, also became a professional footballer in the same position.

Managerial statistics

Honours
Benfica
Primeira Liga: 1993–94
Taça de Portugal: 1992–93, 1995–96, 2003–04

Deportivo
Copa del Rey: 2001–02
Supercopa de España: 2000

References

External links

1971 births
Living people
Portuguese sportspeople of Angolan descent
Portuguese footballers
Footballers from Luanda
Association football defenders
Primeira Liga players
Liga Portugal 2 players
G.D. Estoril Praia players
S.L. Benfica footballers
La Liga players
Deportivo de La Coruña players
Premier League players
Newcastle United F.C. players
Ligue 1 players
Paris Saint-Germain F.C. players
Super League Greece players
Athlitiki Enosi Larissa F.C. players
Portugal under-21 international footballers
Portugal international footballers
UEFA Euro 1996 players
Portuguese expatriate footballers
Expatriate footballers in Spain
Expatriate footballers in England
Expatriate footballers in France
Expatriate footballers in Greece
Portuguese expatriate sportspeople in Spain
Portuguese expatriate sportspeople in England
Portuguese expatriate sportspeople in France
Portuguese expatriate sportspeople in Greece
Portuguese football managers
Liga Portugal 2 managers
G.D. Estoril Praia managers
S.L. Benfica B managers
F.C. Penafiel managers
Saudi Professional League managers
Al Nassr FC managers
Ettifaq FC managers
Al-Hazm FC managers
Slovak Super Liga managers
FC DAC 1904 Dunajská Streda managers
Portuguese expatriate football managers
Expatriate football managers in Saudi Arabia
Expatriate football managers in Slovakia
Portuguese expatriate sportspeople in Saudi Arabia
Portuguese expatriate sportspeople in Slovakia